Rachele Mori (born 29 March 2003) is an Italian hammer thrower who won the gold medal at the 2022 World Athletics U20 Championships.

She is the sister of the rugby union player Federico  Mori, both nephews of the world champion of 400 m hs in Seville 1999 Fabrizio Mori.

Career
Her personal best of 68.04 m in hammer throw, established in 2022 at the age of 19, in addition to being the new U20 Italian record, also represents the 5th best all-time performance in Italy at open level.

National records
Under 20
 Hammer throw: 68.04 m, ( Lucca, 28 May 2022) - Current holder

Achievements

See also
Italian all-time lists - Hammer throw

References

External links
 

2003 births
Living people
Italian female hammer throwers
Athletics competitors of Fiamme Gialle
21st-century Italian women
World Athletics U20 Championships winners